PSA Phuentsholing Stadium, also known as Phuentsholing Football Ground, is a 5,000-capacity football stadium located in Phuntsholing, Bhutan. The Bhutan Olympic Committee instigated a major sport venue construction project in 2016 which included the insertion of multiple additions to the stadium.
Opened to the public in summer 2011, the field was previously prepared for paddy transplantations by the local footballers.

It is the only recreational venue in Phuntsholing. For example, the annual inter-departmental football tournament start depends solely on the PSA Football Ground being ready for usage.

Preparatory work on the stadium was needed as it was hosting an event to celebrate Bhutan's monarch Jigme Khesar Namgyel Wangchuck.

Ground
Hosting the 2011 Bhutan Monsoon Tournament, more fixtures were played irrespective of the rainfall reducing the pitch to a desolate field of uprooted grass roots which was a problem in the monsoon season.

Artificial turf was built to supplant the sand pitch, costing  a budget of 16.5 million Bhutanese ngultrums.

Expansions
2009–2010

A facelift of the PSA Football Ground started in 2009 which saw a three-sided public gallery that could contain 5,000 people. A considerable sum of 9.8 million Bhutanese ngultrums was provided in assistance to the project from the Asian Development Bank.

2017
A V-shaped drain was constructed as well as the laying of paved blocks. Around 90,428 Bhutanese ngultrums were paid to the contractors in accordance with the instruction to the bidders.

References

Football venues in Bhutan
Sports venues in Bhutan
Sports venues completed in 2016
2011 establishments in Bhutan